The World Club Series was an annual rugby league football competition played between clubs from the NRL (Australia and New Zealand) and the Super League (England and France). The competition culminated with the World Club Challenge, a single match played between the reigning champions of each league.

The World Club Challenge was first contested in 1976 and was expanded to include two invited teams from each league playing a short Series in 2015. The Series was reduced to one invited team from each league in 2017, and suspended (only the usual Challenge was played) in 2018.

History

Origin

The World Club Series was created as an expansion to the World Club Challenge competition which has been played sporadically since it began unofficially in 1976. Games were played on a somewhat ad-hoc basis throughout the 1980s and 1990s before returning to a one-off match between the League champions in 1998.

Between 1998 and 2014 the World Club Challenge was played as an annual fixture at the beginning of each Rugby League season.

2014: Creation
In September 2014 it was announced that the World Club Challenge would be expanded, with four extra clubs participating in the World Club Series. The first edition took place between 20 and 22 February 2015 and featured three matches, the first and second essentially being two exhibition games and the final game being for the World Club Challenge match between the two respective premiers as in previous years. The first World Club Series was won outright by the Australians with St. George Illawarra Dragons and Brisbane Broncos narrowly beating Warrington Wolves and Wigan Warriors in the first two games to win the series and South Sydney beating St Helens 39–0 in the World Club Challenge, which was the biggest winning margin in the history of the competition.

2015-2016: Possible Further Expansion

In 2016 a possible expansion to 8 teams was suggested. This would see two games being played in Australia and two games being played in the UK. The World Club Challenge would be played alternatively between the UK and Australia each year and a new points system would be introduced to determine the series winners: one point would be awarded to the winners of the first four games and two points to the winners of the World Club Challenge.

This expansion ultimately did not eventuate and it remained a six team format in 2015 and 2016.

2017: Contraction

In 2017, the format was reduced to 4 teams, with the NRL citing tight schedules, distant travel and long seasons as an impediment to their participation in the Series. After the NRL negotiated with the Brisbane Broncos, it was decided that they would represent the NRL in an exhibition match vs Warrington Wolves prior to the usual Challenge game between the Super League Champions Wigan Warriors and Cronulla Sutherland Sharks, maintaining the overall Series concept. 2017 would be Super League's first victory since the series began, with Warrington winning 27–18 against Brisbane, and Wigan beating Cronulla 22–6.

Following the reluctance of Australian teams to travel to England for the 2017 tournament there were similar issues with the 2018 tournament. This coupled with, the 2017 Rugby League World Cup being played in Australia at the end of 2017 meant that the preseason for Australian teams was going to be unusually short ahead of the 2018 season and therefore they did not want to make the trip to England for the 2018 series. The Melbourne Storm (2017 NRL Premiers) in particular were reluctant to travel, meaning the series was in danger of cancellation for the first time since the 1990s as it was the Storm that was playing in the World Club Challenge.

In addition and as part of this trip to Australia, Wigan and Hull would also play two exhibition games against South Sydney Rabbitohs and St George Illawarra Dragons respectively. These were separately arranged fixtures and not considered part of the World Club Series.

2018: Return of the World Club Challenge

In November 2017, it was confirmed that the World Club Challenge would return to a one-game format for the first time since 2014 with Super League Champions Leeds Rhinos travelling to Australia to play NRL Champions Melbourne Storm at AAMI Park in Melbourne.  On 16 February 2018, Melbourne Storm were victorious, outscoring Leeds Rhinos by 38 points to 4.

2019: World Club Challenge
It is not known if and or when an expanded World Club Series will return and the 2019 World Club Challenge will again be a one-game format with NRL Premiership-winners, Sydney Roosters travelling to the UK to play Super League Champions Wigan Warriors at Wigan's DW Stadium on Sunday 17 February 2019 (kick-off 7pm).

Qualification
Qualification rules in the two league competitions mean that, in theory, teams from four different countries could compete in the competition.  English and French teams compete in the Super League and so are eligible to win that competition and qualify for the series.  In the NRL, teams from Australia and one team from New Zealand compete and so could win their league to qualify.

Super League
The two teams from Super League that qualify to play in the World Club Series are:
League Leaders
Grand Final Winners

If a team wins both Grand Final and League Leaders' Shield then the Grand Final runners up will qualify.

NRL
Qualification for the NRL has varied since the World Club series was first instituted in 2015. While the NRL Premiers always play off for the World club Challenge each year, the teams representing the NRL in the other two games have altered from year to year. Normally, the Grand Final Winners, Runners up and Minor Premiers are given first option to play; however, history has shown that it is either invited teams that make up the numbers or teams that are "willing to travel" who take part.

Results
 Each match with a gold background is the World Club Challenge match.

NOTE: No series in 2018, reverted to a single World Club Challenge match

Club statistics

Series wins

Venues

Attendance

Highest

Lowest

Referees

Most matches refereed

Sponsors

Records

See also

References

Sources
 
 Rugby Super League website
 telegraph.co.uk website

External links
RLIF.ORG – Rugby League International Federation
World Club Challenge Preview
World Club Challenge Review
World Club Challenge at 188-rugby-league.co.uk

 
Recurring sporting events established in 2015